Lloyd Josiah Richardson (born 11 May 1950) is a Sint Maarten politician of the United People's Party (UPP). He has been a member of Parliament since 10 October 2010,  serving as President of Parliament from 1 December 2014 to 12 October 2015.

History
Richardson was born on 11 May 1950 on Aruba to Josier A. Richardson and Barbara Richardson (née Alexander). As a child Richardson attended Irene Primary school in San Nicholas, Aruba. He received his associate degree in Liberal Arts at the University of the Southern Caribbean in Maracas Valley, Trinidad,  his Bachelor of Science degree in chemistry at Andrews University in Berrien Springs, Michigan and his M.D. degree from the Universidad Autónoma de Guadalajara, in 1979.

In 1981, Richardson moved to Sint Maarten, and began working for Sint Maarten's leading healthcare provider SZV Social & Health Insurances as the first control physician. He held this position until his retirement in 2010.

In 2008 he received the Excellence Award for his role in the realisation of the local drug and alcohol rehabilitation centre Turning Point, an award given out annually by Philipsburg Mutual Improvement Association (PMIA). In 2014 the University of the Southern Caribbean awarded Richardson their Alumni Humanitarian Award.

Richardson has been married to Dianne Forde since 1983, the couple has three children.

References

Living people
1950 births
Presidents of the Parliament of Sint Maarten
Members of the Parliament of Sint Maarten
Andrews University alumni
United People's Party (Sint Maarten) politicians
21st-century politicians
University of the Southern Caribbean alumni
Universidad Autónoma de Guadalajara alumni